Al Mustaqbal is a football club from Jumayl, near Zuwara, in the west of Libya. It plays in the Libyan Premier League

References

Football clubs in Libya